Pallas Art School was an Estonian art school which existed 1919–1944 in Tartu. The school was the first Estonian art school which gave higher education in art.

The school was established in 1919 by the Pallas Art Society. Key persons of establishing were Konrad Mägi, Aleksander Tassa, Ado Vabbe, Johannes Einsild and Anton Starkopf.

The school offered courses in painting, graphics and sculpture.

The building was destroyed in a fire during street battles of the Soviet Tartu Offensive on 26 August 1944.

References

Art schools in Estonia
Education in Tartu